Céline Allainmat (born 7 August 1982) is a French female rugby union player. She represented  at the 2006 Women's Rugby World Cup, and 2010 Women's Rugby World Cup.

References

1982 births
Living people
French female rugby union players
France international women's rugby sevens players